Frattaminore is a comune (municipality) in the Metropolitan City of Naples in the Italian region Campania, located about 13 km north of Naples.

Frattaminore borders the following municipalities: Crispano, Frattamaggiore, Orta di Atella, Sant'Arpino.

References

External links
 Official website

Cities and towns in Campania